The All India Students' Federation (AISF) is the oldest surviving student organisation in India, founded in 1936.

Pre-independence
AISF was founded on 12 August 1936, with guidance and cooperation from the Indian independence movement. The foundation conference of the AISF was held at Ganga Prasad Memorial Hall in Lucknow, with 936 delegates from across India. The conference was inaugurated by Jawaharlal Nehru, and presided over by M.A. Jinnah. The conference resolved to establish an All India Students' Federation, and Prem Narayan Bhargava was elected as the first general secretary.

The second conference of the AISF was held three months later, beginning on 22 November 1936 in Lahore. It mainly discussed and adopted the constitution of the AISF. The conference was attended by about 150 delegates under the presidency of Sarat Chandra Bose. The conference was also addressed by Govind Ballabh Pant. It passed a resolution condemning the intervention by Nazi Germany into the affairs of Republican Spain. The conference also agreed to affiliate the AISF with the World Students' Association.

Hemu Kalani, an AISF leader, was arrested by the British army in 1942 for leading the Quit India Movement, and publicly hanged in 1943 at the age of 19. AISF leader Kanaklata Barua was another student leader who died participating in the fight for independence.

An AISF delegation visited the Bengal state during the famine of 1943 and engaged in relief activities.

During the Royal Indian Navy mutiny in Bombay in February 1946, the AISF helped to mobilize students in support of the Naval Ratings.

AISF in independent India
After independence, the AISF concentrated its activities mainly on educational issues, anti-imperialism and anti-feudalism, providing a platform for student unity against common threats. The AISF played a central role in the Telangana Rebellion against the Nizam of Hyderabad.

The AISF continued to fight for Indian unity with the Goa Liberation Movement. Satyagrahis from across India entered Goa on 15 August 1955 and were fired upon. 23-year-old Karnail Singh Benipal was killed when he tried to save his leader V.D. Chitale. The general secretary of the AISF, Sukhendu Mazumdar, was present with AISF leader C.K. Chandrappan on 15 August at the Goa border to help the student satyagrahis.

The AISF participated in the Kothari Commission report, which provided the basis for broad educational reforms in India.

In the 1980s, during the Khalistan movement, the AISF, under the leadership of General Secretary Satyapal Dang, received armed training to counter Khalistan militants. Harpal Mohali, the AISF leader from Mohali, led movements in Punjab University. In response to his attempt to counter Khalistan, Mohali was shot by militants and left paralyzed. Many AISF activists were killed fighting against Khalistan separatism.

State-level presence
The AISF has a strong presence in Kerala, Bihar, West Bengal, Tripura, Telangana, Andhra Pradesh, Tamil Nadu, Karnataka, Assam, Odisha, Uttarpradesh, Maharashtra, New Delhi, and Punjab, and in most universities in the country.

Activities

Protest and demands
The AISF protested against the National Education Policy in 2019, and proposed increases in university fees.
AISF members were active in multiple Citizenship Amendment Act protests in 2019.
During the COVID-19 pandemic in India, AISF activists called for the distribution of essential products in various states. The federation set up COVID-19 helpline numbers in various states to help students, and also distributed facemasks and hand sanitiser.
The AISF held a hunger strike in August 2021, demanding a fresh job calendar in Andhra Pradesh. The federation has also campaigned against the privatization of schools and colleges in the state.
AISF activists protested against alleged errors in results of the Railway Recruitment Board's Non-Technical Popular Categories (RRB NTPC) exam, during Bihar Bandh, in Patna on 28 January 2022.
The AISF organised a national convention, "Reject NEP 2020" against the National Education Policy (NEP) on 15 May 2022 in Chennai. The convention called for a united front of students and teachers of all educational institutions for the withdrawal of the NEP, the National Eligibility-cum-Entrance Test (NEET) and the Central Universities Common Entrance Test (CUET).

Other social work
The AISF runs Sramajibi Canteen and is involved in various other social work.

LGBT issues 
The AISF actively supports LGBT rights. In 2022, AISF state committee member Nadira Mehrin became the first transgender person to contest in a student union election at Kerala University, and also contested as the AISF candidate for chair of Sree Sankaracharya University of Sanskrit (SSUS), the first time a transgender person had led a candidates' panel for a university election in the state.

Motto and organisational structure
The organisation's original motto, reflecting its focus on peace, progress and scientific socialism, was "Freedom, Peace and Progress". This was amended
at the 1958 National Convention, and the motto since then has been "Study & Struggle".

The administrative structure of the federation includes:
 National executive body
 State executive body
 State administrative body
 District administrative body
 Block level committee
 Institutions level unions

AISF National Conferences

Present leadership

At the 29th AISF National Conference, held in September 2018 in Anantapur, Andhra Pradesh, Shuvam Banerjee from West Bengal was elected as National President and Vicky Mahesari from Punjab was elected as General Secretary. In Jawaharlal Nehru University Students' Union 2019–20, Md. Danish was elected the joint secretary with a large majority.

Notable leaders
 Inder Kumar Gujral - Former Prime Minister of India
 Karpoori Thakur - Former Chief Minister of Bihar
 P. K. Vasudevan Nair - Former Chief Minister of Kerala
 A. B. Bardhan - Former General secretary of the Communist Party of India
 C. K. Chandrappan - Parliamentarian
 Biswanath Mukherjee - Former leader of the Communist Party of India and one of the founder of AISF in Bengal.
 Aruna Asaf Ali- Indian educator
 Suravaram Sudhakar Reddy - Former General secretary of the Communist Party of India.
 D. Raja - Current General secretary of the Communist Party of India.
 Amarjeet Kaur - General Secretary of AITUC
 Hemu Kalani - Sindh independence activist and Student leader, hanged to death by British
 Satyapal Dang - Former minister in the government of Punjab
 Kanaklata Barua - Independence activist
 Atul Kumar Anjan - senior CPI leader and national secretary.
 Kanhaiya Kumar - Former President of the Jawaharlal Nehru University Students' Union
 O. N. V. Kurup – Malayalam poet & former leader
 Malayattoor Ramakrishnan – Malayalam writer & former leader
 Biswanath Mukherjee - one of the founder of AISF in West Bengal and former MLA
 M. Vijayan - Indian structural biologist
 Binoy Viswam - National secretary of AISF and Former minister in the Government of Kerala
 Rajaji Mathew Thomas - Former Vice President of World Federation of Democratic Youth (WFDY) and Former MLA in Kerala
 V. S. Sunil Kumar - Former Minister of Agriculture in Kerala
 K. Rajan - Minister of Revenue in Kerala
 P. Prasad - Minister of Agriculture in Kerala
 Muhammed Muhsin - Member of the Kerala Legislative Assembly representing Pattambi constituency

See also
 List of Indian student organisations

References

External links
 Official website
 Constitution of AISF

External links

Indian independence movement
Student organizations established in 1936
1936 establishments in India
Organisations based in Delhi
Student organisations in India
Volunteer organisations in India
Student wings of communist parties of India
Student wings of political parties in India